Neston is a village and civil parish on the Wirral Peninsula, in Cheshire, England. It is part of the unitary authority of Cheshire West and Chester. The village of Parkgate is located to the north west and the villages of Little Neston and Ness Holt are to the south of Neston. 

At the 2001 census the population of Neston ward was recorded as 3,521, 
increasing to 4,329 at the 2011 census. 
The civil parish also includes Little Neston, Parkgate, Willaston and part of Burton and Ness, and had a population of 15,162 in 2001, increasing to 15,221 in 2011.

History
The name is of Viking origin, deriving from the Old Norse Nes-tún, meaning 'farmstead or settlement at/near a promontory or headland'.
Another Nesttun village can be found near Bergen, Norway.
It is also mentioned in the Domesday Book of 1086 as Nestone under the ownership of a William Fitznigel, with a population of eight households.

Civic history
A royal charter was granted to Neston in 1728 in support of its status as a market village.

Historically, the current settlement was known as Great Neston, in order to be distinct from the smaller nearby hamlet of Little Neston. Before the rise of Birkenhead in the 1820s, it was the largest village in the Wirral Hundred. Created in 1866, the civil parish of Great Neston included the hamlets of Clayhill, Hinderton, Moorside and part of Parkgate. The population of Great Neston was 1,486 in 1801 and 1,524 in 1851. In 1894, both Great Neston and Little Neston were combined to create the Neston-cum-Parkgate civil parish and by 1901, the population had risen to 2,201. 
Between 1894 and 1974 Neston was governed by its own urban district council. 
On 1 April 1974, local government reorganisation in England and Wales created the borough of Ellesmere Port and Neston. This remained until 2009, when it became part of Cheshire West and Chester.

Port
Neston was a major port before the River Dee silted up. The port was then shifted further downstream to the nearby village of Parkgate, although by early nineteenth century, most traffic had ultimately transferred to Liverpool.

Mining
Neston is also a former mining village with a small extension of the Flintshire Coalfield occurring on its southern edge. There were two periods during which coal seams within these coal measures rocks were mined.

Between 1759 and 1855 Ness Colliery worked using shafts largely clustered around the Harp Inn in today's Little Neston. It was opened by John Stanley Massey, a member of the leading Stanley family of Hooton, in partnership with four others. Because of the local geology most working was carried out under the Dee Estuary. The mine was remarkable in using canals deep underground for boats to haul coal. It was also remarkable for blatant acts of sabotage committed by the Stanleys against a rival, neighbouring mine established in about 1820 by the Cottingham family; their mine went out of business in the 1840s. Due to exhaustion of many of the coal seams, and difficulty in transporting coal, Ness Colliery was closed in 1855.

The later period of mining started in 1875 with the establishment of Neston Colliery (later becoming Wirral Colliery). By this time the Chester and Birkenhead Railway had come to nearby Parkgate; a branch line to the colliery enabled coal to be shifted in bulk. The mine worked seams further north than those worked by Ness Colliery. Wirral colliery was taken over by the British government during the First World War. The pit subsequently returned to private ownership after the war, but increasing competition from larger mines brought about its closure in 1927 with a loss of 180 jobs.

Geography

Suburban localities of Neston are:

 Parkgate
Little Neston
 Ness
 Willaston
 Burton
 Puddington

Former suburbs of Neston:
Leighton

Transport

The A540 road links Neston to Heswall and West Kirby to the north, and Cheshire, Chester and North Wales to the south. Neston is also close to the M53 and M56 motorways, giving it access to Liverpool, Manchester, and the larger M6 motorway.

Neston railway station is situated on the Borderlands Line, providing direct services southbound to Flintshire and Wrexham, and northbound to Bidston, with connecting services to the Merseyrail network between West Kirby and Liverpool. In 2008, Merseytravel investigated the possibility of linking up the Bidston – Wrexham line to the electrified Merseyrail system.

Community

Local Area
Neston is considered a desirable place to live, with its many independent shops, cafes and bars. It is also within walking distance to nearby Parkgate, as well as links to countryside walks and the Wirral Way.

Places of Interest
One of the main local attractions is Ness Gardens, opened in 1898 and administered by the University of Liverpool.

Events
Neston hosts a weekly market every Friday, offering local produce including fruit and vegetables, meat, fish, cheese and baked goods.

On the first Thursday of June, Neston annually celebrates Ladies Club Day (known colloquially as Ladies Day or Club Day). This is a unique marching day that has links to the Neston Female Friendly Society during the Napoleonic War.

Education
Neston High School serves the local secondary age students.

Neston Market Initiative
From 2006, Neston underwent an assessment to attract more income and tourists, in the form of the Neston Market Initiative (NMI).
The project also included the launch of a new village website. The NMI involved improving the 'look' of the village (including new shop fronts) and controversial plans for a new supermarket on the site of Brook Street car park. Work for the new supermarket began in March 2009 with a full archaeological dig being carried out on the car park site before construction work began. Work to excavate the site began in August 2009, resulting in the removal of 28,000 cubic metres of earth to allow for the construction of a multi storey car park. The new Sainsbury's store was opened on 1 December 2010.

On 31 March 2008 the Neston Market Initiative project was officially completed. The community regeneration has been continued by a new local community association

Sport

Neston Cricket Club is located in Parkgate and play in the Cheshire County Cricket ECB Premier League. 
Neston Hockey Club is also based on the same site. 
Club members can also play bowls, squash, racketball and tennis.

Governance

Neston is part of the parliamentary constituency of Ellesmere Port and Neston. The current Member of Parliament is Justin Madders, a Labour representative.

At local government level, the unitary authority of Cheshire West and Chester replaced Ellesmere Port and Neston Borough Council and Cheshire County Council on 1 April 2009. Neston is a ward within Cheshire West and Chester. The most recent local elections took place on 2 May 2019.

The residents of Neston, Little Neston and Parkgate have also been represented by an elected council, who meet at the former Neston Town Hall.

Demography

Religion

Notable people 

 Thomas Wilson (1663 in Burton and Ness – 1755), Bishop of Sodor and Man between 1697 and 1755. 
 Emma, Lady Hamilton (1765 in Swan Cottage, Ness – 1815), an English model and actress, mistress of Lord Nelson and muse of the portrait artist, George Romney
Paul Ince, former Premier League footballer for Liverpool Football Club and Manchester United, lives in Neston.
 Sir Wilfred Grenfell KCMG (1865 in Neston – 1940), a medical missionary to Newfoundland
 Lieutenant Colonel Christopher Bushell VC DSO (1888 in Neston – 1918 in Morlancourt, France), an English recipient of the Victoria Cross
 Billy Congreve VC, DSO, MC (1891 in Neston – 1916 in Longueval, France), an English recipient of the Victoria Cross
 Rosalind Hill (1908–1997), historian 
 George Ward Gunn VC MC (1912 in Neston – 1941 in Sidi Rezegh, Libya), an English recipient of the Victoria Cross
 Ralph Millington (1930 in Neston – 1999), an English footballer who played 357 games for Tranmere Rovers F.C.
 Sir Tim Hunt FRS FMedSci FRSE MAE (born 1943 in Neston), a British biochemist and molecular physiologist, jointly awarded the 2001 Nobel Prize in Physiology or Medicine for discoveries about protein molecules
 Patrick Wormald (1947 in Neston – 2004), a British historian and academic

See also

Listed buildings in Neston
St Mary's and St Helen's Church, Neston

References
Citations

Sources

External links

 
Civil parishes in Cheshire
Market towns in Cheshire
Towns in Cheshire